Små ord av guld is a studio album by Swedish dansband Larz-Kristerz, released on 25 September 2010. The album was awarded a Guldklaven award in the "Album of the year" category.

Track listing
"Är du lika ensam som jag"
"Små ord av guld"
"Zetorn"
"Natten har tusen ögon (Cuando salí de Cuba)"
"Gasen i botten"
"Life Is Life"
"OK nu glömmer jag dig"
"Den som älskar"
"När sanningen sjunkit in"
"Hälsa Marie från mig"
"Cruisin' on a Saturday Night"
"Jag kan glömma"
"Pröva lite kärlek nån gång"
"Cool Cat Walk"
"Love Me"

Charts

Weekly charts

Year-end charts

References 

2010 albums
Larz-Kristerz albums
Swedish-language albums